Phulambri is a town and headquarter of Phulambri Taluka in Aurangabad district in the state of Maharashtra, India.

Religion

Religion in Phulambri Taluka

Hinduism is strong in Phulambri Taluka with 82.52%  which is  more than Average 69% of Aurangabad district. Muslims constitute 12% of the population Thirs ranked religion is Navayana Buddhism which is practiced by 4.77% of the population.

References

Cities and towns in Aurangabad district, Maharashtra
Talukas in Maharashtra